A Day with Dana is a British chat show hosted by Dana Rosemary Scallon which was first aired on BBC Two in 1974.

Episodes

References

External links
 

1974 British television series debuts
1975 British television series endings
1970s British television talk shows
BBC Television shows
BBC television talk shows